The Congress Hotel was a hotel in Portland, Oregon. The hotel has been demolished and replaced by the Congress Center.

References

Demolished buildings and structures in Portland, Oregon
Demolished hotels in Oregon
Southwest Portland, Oregon